Aeshna williamsoniana,  Williamson's darner,  is a species of dragonfly in the family Aeshnidae. It is found in Belize, Costa Rica, Guatemala, Mexico, Panama, and possibly Honduras. Its natural habitats are subtropical or tropical moist montane forests and rivers. It is threatened by habitat loss.

References

Sources

Aeshnidae
Insects described in 1905
Taxonomy articles created by Polbot